Leiranger is a former municipality in Nordland county, Norway. The  municipality existed from 1900 until its dissolution in 1964. The municipality was encompassed the around the Leinesfjorden and the islands surrounding the mouth of the fjord in what is now Steigen Municipality. The administrative centre of Leiranger was the village of Leines. The village of Leinesfjorden lies at the end of the fjord.

History
The municipality was established on 1 September 1900 when the southern district of Steigen Municipality was separated to become the new municipality of Ledingen.  Initially, the municipality had 1,117 residents.  In 1910, the name was changed to Leiranger.  During the 1960s, there were many municipal mergers across Norway due to the work of the Schei Committee. On 1 January 1964, the following areas were merged to form a new, larger Steigen Municipality:
 all of Leiranger Municipality (population: 1,397) 
 all of Steigen Municipality (population: 1,829)
 most of Nordfold Municipality, except for the Mørsvikbotn area (population: 1,212)
 the area south of the Sagfjorden in Hamarøy Municipality (population: 77)
 the Brennsund area of Kjerringøy Municipality (population: 30)

Name
The municipality was originally named Ledingen from 1900 until 1910 when it was renamed Leiranger. Both names come from the local fjord (or a more modern form Leirangr) which is now called the Leinesfjord. Thus the name means the "clay fjord".

Government
While it existed, this municipality was responsible for primary education (through 10th grade), outpatient health services, senior citizen services, unemployment, social services, zoning, economic development, and municipal roads. During its existence, this municipality was governed by a municipal council of elected representatives, which in turn elected a mayor.

Municipal council
The municipal council  of Leiranger was made up of representatives that were elected to four year terms.  The party breakdown of the final municipal council was as follows:

See also
List of former municipalities of Norway

References

Steigen
Former municipalities of Norway
1900 establishments in Norway
1964 disestablishments in Norway